Faida Mohamed Bakar (born 20 March 1963) is a Member of Parliament in the National Assembly of Tanzania. She has held a special seat in the parliament for three terms (2000–2005, 2005–2010, and 2010–2015), and has also served as an official in the Chama Cha Mapinduzi, the ruling party of Tanzania.

References

Living people
1963 births
Members of the National Assembly (Tanzania)